The 2015 Big South men's basketball tournament was the postseason men's basketball tournament for the Big South Conference that took place March 4–8, 2015, at the HTC Center in Conway, South Carolina. Quarterfinals and semifinal games were broadcast on ESPN3, with the championship game was televised on ESPN2.  All 11 teams were eligible for the tournament. Teams were seeded 1-11, with the top five teams earning a first round bye. Previously, teams were split into two divisions.

Seeds

Schedule

Bracket

References

Tournament
Big South Conference men's basketball tournament
Big South Conference men's basketball tournament
Big South Conference men's basketball tournament